Moez Ben Cherifia (born 24 June 1991) is a Tunisian professional footballer who plays as a goalkeeper for Espérance de Tunis, whom he captains, and the Tunisia national team.

International career
In May 2018, Moez was named in Tunisia’s preliminary 29-man squad for the 2018 World Cup in Russia but did not make the final 23-man squad.

Career statistics

International

References

External links
 

1991 births
Living people
Footballers from Tunis
Tunisian footballers
Tunisia international footballers
2012 Africa Cup of Nations players
2013 Africa Cup of Nations players
2015 Africa Cup of Nations players
2017 Africa Cup of Nations players
Association football goalkeepers
2019 Africa Cup of Nations players
Espérance Sportive de Tunis players